Little Fishing Lake is a hamlet in the Canadian province of Saskatchewan on Little Fishing Lake in the Bronson Lake Provincial Recreation Site. It is a popular summer resort as there's a beach with a swimming area and fishing opportunities for northern pike and walleye. A rustic campground, convenience store, and a subdivision are developed around the lake. Access to the community and the lake is from Highway 21.

Demographics 

See also 
 List of communities in Saskatchewan

References 

Designated places in Saskatchewan
Loon Lake No. 561, Saskatchewan
Organized hamlets in Saskatchewan
Division No. 17, Saskatchewan